Alfa Romeo may refer to:

Alfa Romeo, an Italian car manufacturer
Alfa Romeo I, a 2002 yacht
Alfa Romeo II, a 2005 yacht
Alfa Romeo III, a 2008 yacht